The men's high jump at the 2014 European Athletics Championships took place at the Letzigrund on 13 and 15 August.

Medalists

Records

Schedule

Results

Qualification

Qualification: Qualification Performance 2.28 (Q) or at least 12 best performers advance to the final

Final

References

Qualification Results
Final Results

High Jump M
High jump at the European Athletics Championships